Aq Qaleh (also Romanized as Āq Qal‘eh; also known as Āgh Qal‘eh and Āk Kaleh) is a village in Arshaq Sharqi Rural District, in the Central District of Ardabil County, Ardabil Province, Iran. At the 2006 census, its population was 119, in 22 families.

References 

Towns and villages in Ardabil County